News7 Tamil is a Tamil news channel headquartered at Chennai, Tamil Nadu, India. It is owned by the Tamil Nadu-based VV Group. News7 Tamil Television launched on 19 October 2014. It broadcasts news, discussion, documentary and infotainment programmes.

History 
The channel was launched on October 19, 2014.

References

External links 
 Official Website

Television stations in Chennai
24-hour television news channels in India
Television channels and stations established in 2014
Tamil-language television channels